The Oklahoma City Air Defense Sector (OCADS) is an inactive United States Air Force organization.  Its last assignment was with the Air Defense Command's 29th Air Division at Oklahoma City Air Force Station, Oklahoma.

History 
Oklahoma City Air Defense Sector was established in 1960 as manual sector as part of phaseout of Central Air Defense Force; it was discontinued 1 September 1961 and its personnel and equipment transferred to the 4752d Air Defense Wing, which was designated. organized and assigned to the 32nd Air Division on 1 September 1961. This change was short-lived, for the 4752nd Wing was discontinued and replaced once again by the Oklahoma City Air Defense Sector on 25 June 1963 as a result of the realignment and expansion of the 29th Air Division.  Finally, the sector was inactivated and replaced by the 31st Air Division on 1 April 1966.

The sector operated a Manual Air Defense Control Center (ADCC), P-86, later redesignated Manual Combat Center (MCC-11) and later NORAD Sector Combat Center (Manual).

Lineage
 Established as Oklahoma City Air Defense Sector 
 Activated on 1 January 1960
 Discontinued on 1 September 1961
 Organized on 25 June 1963
 Discontinued and inactivated on 1 April 1966

Assignments 
 33d Air Division, 1 January 1960
 32nd Air Division, 1 July 1961 – 1 July 1961
 29th Air Division, 25 June 1963 – 1 April 1966

Stations 
 Oklahoma City AFS, OK, 1 January 1960 – 1 September 1961
 Oklahoma City AFS, OK, 25 June 1963 – 1 April 1966

Components

Interceptor squadrons
 58th Fighter-Interceptor Squadron
 Walker AFB, New Mexico, 15 September – 25 December 1960
 331st Fighter-Interceptor Squadron
 Webb AFB, Texas, 15 September 1960 – 1 September 1961, 25 June 1963 – 1 April 1966
 332d Fighter-Interceptor Squadron
 England AFB, Louisiana, 1 January – 1 September 1960

Radar squadrons

 653d Aircraft Control and Warning Squadron
 England AFB, Louisiana, 1 January 1960 – 1 August 1963
 683d Aircraft Control and Warning Squadron
 Sweetwater AFS, Texas, 15 September 1960 – 25 June 1963 
 685th Aircraft Control and Warning Squadron
 Las Cruces AFS, New Mexico, 15 September 1960 – 1 August 1963
 686th Aircraft Control and Warning Squadron
 Walker AFB, New Mexico, 15 September 1960 – 1 August 1963
 687th Aircraft Control and Warning Squadron
 West Mesa AFS, New Mexico, 15 September 1960 – 25 June 1963
 688th Aircraft Control and Warning Squadron
 Amarillo AFB, Texas, 15 September 1960 – 25 June 1963
 697th Aircraft Control and Warning Squadron
 Pyote AFS, Texas, 15 September 1960 – 1 August 1963
 703d Aircraft Control and Warning Squadron
 Texarkana AFS, Arkansas, 1 September 1961 – 1 April 1966
 732d Aircraft Control and Warning Squadron
 Ozona AFS, Texas, 15 September 1960 – 1 August 1963
 733d Aircraft Control and Warning Squadron
 Eagle Pass AFS, Texas, 1 September 1961 – 1 August 1963
 741st Aircraft Control and Warning Squadron
 Lackland AFB, Texas, 1 September 1961 – 25 June 1963

 742d Aircraft Control and Warning Squadron
 Zapata AFS, Texas, 1 January 1960 – 1 June 1961
 745th Aircraft Control and Warning Squadron
 Duncanville AFS, Texas, 1 January 1960 – 25 June 1963
 746th Aircraft Control and Warning Squadron
 Oklahoma City AFS, Oklahoma, 1 January 1960 – 25 June 1963
 747th Aircraft Control and Warning Squadron
 Ellington Field, Texas, 1 January 1960 – 25 June 1963
 768th Aircraft Control and Warning Squadron
 Moriarty AFS, New Mexico, 15 September 1960 – 1 June 1961
 769th Aircraft Control and Warning Squadron
 Continental Divide AFS, New Mexico, 15 September 1960 – 1 July 1961
 811th Aircraft Control and Warning Squadron
 Port Isabel AFS, Texas, 8 April 1956 – 30 April 1957; 1 January 1960 – 1 June 1961
 813th Aircraft Control and Warning Squadron
 Rockport AFS, Texas, 1 January 1960 – 1 August 1963
 814th Aircraft Control and Warning Squadron
 Killeen AFS, Texas, 1 January 1960 – 1 February 1961
 815th Aircraft Control and Warning Squadron
 Lufkin AFS, Texas, 1 January 1960 – 1 June 1961

See also
 List of USAF Aerospace Defense Command General Surveillance Radar Stations
 Aerospace Defense Command Fighter Squadrons
 List of United States Air Force aircraft control and warning squadrons
 List of MAJCOM wings

References

Notes

Bibliography

 
 * 

Further reading

External links

Air Defense
Aerospace Defense Command units
Radar networks
Military units and formations established in 1960
Military units and formations in Oklahoma
1960 establishments in Oklahoma
1966 disestablishments in Oklahoma